In statistics, the Bonferroni correction is a method to counteract the multiple comparisons problem.

Background
The method is named for its use of the Bonferroni inequalities.
An extension of the method to confidence intervals was proposed by Olive Jean Dunn.

Statistical hypothesis testing is based on rejecting the null hypothesis if the likelihood of the observed data under the null hypotheses is low. If multiple hypotheses are tested, the probability of observing a rare event increases, and therefore, the likelihood of incorrectly rejecting a null hypothesis (i.e., making a Type I error) increases.

Likewise, when constructing multiple confidence intervals the same phenomenon appears.

Definition
Let  be a family of hypotheses and  their corresponding p-values. Let  be the total number of null hypotheses, and let  be the number of true null hypotheses (which is presumably unknown to the researcher). The family-wise error rate (FWER) is the probability of rejecting at least one true , that is, of making at least one type I error. Proof of this control follows from Boole's inequality, as follows:

 

This control does not require any assumptions about dependence among the p-values or about how many of the null hypotheses are true.

Extensions

Generalization
For example, for two hypothesis tests, an overall  of 0.05 could be maintained by conducting one test at 0.04 and the other at 0.01.

Confidence intervals
The procedure proposed by Dunn can be used to adjust confidence intervals.

Continuous problems
When searching for a signal in a continuous parameter space there can also be a problem of multiple comparisons, or look-elsewhere effect. For example, a physicist might be looking to discover a particle of unknown mass by considering a large range of masses; this was the case during the Nobel Prize winning detection of the Higgs boson. In such cases, one can apply a continuous generalization of the Bonferroni correction by employing Bayesian logic to relate the effective number of trials, to the prior-to-posterior volume ratio.

Alternatives

There are alternative ways to control the family-wise error rate. For example, the Holm–Bonferroni method and the Šidák correction are universally more powerful procedures than the Bonferroni correction, meaning that they are always at least as powerful. Unlike the Bonferroni procedure, these methods do not control the expected number of Type I errors per family (the per-family Type I error rate).

Criticism
With respect to FWER control, the Bonferroni correction can be conservative if there are a large number of tests and/or the test statistics are positively correlated.

The correction comes at the cost of increasing the probability of producing false negatives, i.e., reducing statistical power. There is not a definitive consensus on how to define a family in all cases, and adjusted test results may vary depending on the number of tests included in the family of hypotheses. Such criticisms apply to FWER control in general, and are not specific to the Bonferroni correction.

References

External links
Bonferroni, Sidak online calculator

Multiple comparisons
Statistical hypothesis testing